Bacchetta is a brand of recumbent bicycles based in North Hollywood, Los Angeles, California, United States. The company was founded in 2001 and it makes recumbent bikes  and accessories.

On June 18, 2021, the Bacchetta Brand Line was sold to Bent Up Cycles.

Models
Long Wheelbase
 Bella (20"/26" wheels) 
 Agio (20"/26" wheels) (Discontinued)

Short Wheelbase 
 Giro-20 (20"/26" wheels) (Discontinued)
 Giro-A20 (20"/26" wheels) 
 Giro-A26 (dual 26" wheels)
 Corsa-A70 (dual 700c wheels) 
 Corsa-A65 (dual 650c wheels)
 Carbon Corsa (dual 700 or 650c wheels) (Discontinued)
 Carbon Aero 2.0 700c (dual 700c wheels) (Discontinued)
 Carbon Aero 2.0 650c (dual 650c wheels) (Discontinued) 
 Carbon Aero 3.0 700c (dual 700c wheels, disc brake compatible) 
 Carbon Basso 2.0 (20"/700c wheels) (Discontinued) 
 Carbon Basso 3.0 (20"/700c wheels, disc brake compatible)

Trikes
 CarbonTrike CT2.0 (2x 20"wheels / 1x 700c wheel) (Discontinued in April 2021 when the design was sold back to Carbontrikes)

References

Bicycles